Acacia hylonoma, commonly known as Yarrabah wattle, is a shrub of the genus Acacia and the subgenus Plurinerves that is endemic to a small area of north eastern Australia.

Description
It has glabrous and lenticellate branchlets. Like most species of Acacia it has phyllodes rather than true leaves. The thinly leathery, glabrous and evergreen phyllodes have a narrowly elliptic shape and are straight to shallowly recurved.

Distribution
It is native to a small area in northern Queensland just south east of Cairns where it is a part of rainforest communities. It grows well in disturbed areas and is a component of rain forest regrowth.

Etymology 
The first use of hylonoma as a specific epithet was in 1916 for Salix hylonoma, where the epithet is described as being derived from the Greek, hylonomos, and means "living in woods"

See also
List of Acacia species

References

hylonoma
Flora of Queensland
Taxa named by Leslie Pedley
Plants described in 1978